Carolina Soto Losada was the High Presidential Counsellor for Government, Private Sector and Competitiveness of Colombia. Before holding such post, She was Deputy Minister of Finance and Public Credit of Colombia. She is married to Alejandro Gaviria Uribe, the former Minister of Health and Social Protection of Colombia.

Career
On 5 March 2012, President Juan Manuel Santos Calderón appointed Soto as Deputy Minister of Finance and Public Credit of Colombia.

Selected works

References

Year of birth missing (living people)
Living people
Place of birth missing (living people)
University of Los Andes (Colombia) alumni
School of International and Public Affairs, Columbia University alumni
Colombian economists
Colombian women in politics